Fred M. Hechinger (July 7, 1920 – November 6, 1995) was a German-born American education editor at The New York Times from 1959 to 1990.

Life and career
Hechinger was born in 1920 in Nuremberg, Germany, the son of Lily (Niedermaier) and Dr. Julius Hechinger. His family was Jewish. He came to the U.S. in 1936. He earned his bachelor's degree at City College of New York, where he wrote for the student newspaper, The Campus. He served in the U.S. Army during World War II, where he was a military intelligence officer posted at the War Office in London. He was discharged in 1946 with the rank of master sergeant.

After the war, Hechinger was a student at University of London and then a foreign correspondent for the Overseas News Agency. He then became an education journalist, writing for The Times of London, The New York Herald Tribune (where he became education editor in 1950), and The Washington Post, as well as Harper's. He also spent three years in Bridgeport, Connecticut, as associate publisher and executive editor of the Bridgeport Sunday Herald.

Hechinger spent the majority of his career at The New York Times, joining in 1959 and retiring in 1990. He was an education writer who also served at times on the paper's editorial board, as president of The New York Times Company Foundation, and a president of Times Neediest Cases Fund (from 1977 until his retirement).

After retiring from the Times, Hechinger became senior adviser to the Carnegie Corporation of New York. He was also a member of the National Advisory Committee for the Yale-New Haven Teachers Institute. He died on November 7, 1995, at the age of 75, of cardiac arrest, at his home on Manhattan's Upper East Side.

Family
He married Grace Bernstein; they had two sons, Paul D. Hechinger and John E. Hechinger. His grandson is actor Fred Hechinger.

Legacy
The Fred M. Hechinger Grand Prize for Distinguished Education Reporting was established by Education Writers Association.

The Hechinger Report(Project of Hechinger Institute on Education and the Media) at Teachers College, Columbia University, was named for him after he served as a Teachers College trustee since 1992. 

The Fred M. Hechinger Education Journalism Award is awarded by the Columbia Journalism School.

His papers are held at the Hoover Institution.

Awards
1989 George Polk Career Award
1980 Foreign Language Advocate Award, Northeast Conference on the Teaching of Foreign Languages.
1952 James L. Fisher Award for Distinguished Service to Education
1950 George Polk Award, Education Reporting
1949 George Polk Award, Suburban Reporting

Works
"About Education; A New Elitism Appears in Higher Education", The New York Times, Fred M. Hechinger, November 20, 1984
"The University's Neglected Task", Address by Fred M. Hechinger, December 5, 1991
"Are Schools Better in Other Countries?", In defense of the American public school, Editor Arthur J. Newman, Transaction Publishers, 1978, 
"Sving Youth from Violence", Crossroads: the quest for contemporary rites of passage], Editors Louise Carus Mahdi, Nancy Geyer Christopher, Michael Meade, Open Court Publishing, 1996, 
"Textbooks and Education", Public education under criticism, Editors Cecil Winfield Scott, Clyde Milton Hill, Ayer Publishing, 1954, 
"Eight Weeks in America", The Magpie, June 1937, v. 21, n. 2., p. 12.
An Adventure in Education: Connecticut Points the Way, Macmillan, 1956
The Big Red Schoolhouse Doubleday, 1959; Smith, Peter Publisher, Inc., January 1990, 
Teen-Age Tyranny Morrow, 1963
The New York Times Guide to New York City Private Schools, Simon & Schuster, 1968
Growing Up in America McGraw-Hill, 1975

References

External links
 
 

1920 births
1995 deaths
American education writers
George Polk Award recipients
DeWitt Clinton High School alumni
City College of New York alumni
United States Army personnel of World War II
The New York Times editors
20th-century American non-fiction writers
United States Army officers
German emigrants to the United States